Daines is a surname. Notable people with the surname include:

Barry Daines (born 1951), English football player
Nicholas Daines, English gymnast and diver
Percy Daines (1902–1957), English politician
Richard F. Daines (1951–2011), American physician
Robert H. Daines (1905–1985), American pathologist
Robert H. Daines III (born 1934), American academic and Mormon leader
Steve Daines (born 1962), American politician